Oleh Ivanovych Ptachyk (born 14 November 1981) is a retired Ukrainian football defender who last played for Naftovyk in the Ukrainian Premier League.

External links
 
 

1981 births
Living people
Footballers from Kharkiv
Ukrainian footballers
Association football defenders
Ukrainian expatriate footballers
Expatriate footballers in Belarus
FC Dnepr Mogilev players
FC Spartak Sumy players
FC Chornomorets Odesa players
FC Volyn Lutsk players
FC Naftovyk-Ukrnafta Okhtyrka players
FC Nyva Vinnytsia players
Ukrainian Premier League players
Ukrainian First League players